Stephanie Sinclair (born 1973) is an American photojournalist who focuses on gender and human-rights issues such as child marriage and self-immolation. Her work has been included in The New York Times, Time Magazine and National Geographic.

Life and work
Sinclair was born in 1973 in Miami, Florida, United States. She graduated from the University of Florida with a B.S. in journalism and an outside concentration in fine art photography.

After college, Sinclair began working for the Chicago Tribune, where she was part of the paper's 2001 Pulitzer-prize winning team in Explanatory Reporting. The Tribune sent her to cover the beginning of the war in Iraq. She later settled in Iraq and then in Beirut, Lebanon, covering the Middle East and South Asia for six years as a freelance photographer. Sinclair joined the VII Network upon its establishment in 2008, and became a full member of VII in 2009.

She first encountered child marriage in 2003 while working on a project about self-immolation in Afghanistan. "All the victims she met had been married very young, some only 9 years old, and to much older men." From 2003–2005 Sinclair photographed young Afghan women who had burned themselves. Most had been married between age 9 and 13. The result was her contribution to the 2010 Whitney Biennial exhibition, "Self-Immolation in Afghanistan: A Cry for Help."

In 2005, her work was featured on The NewsHour With Jim Lehrer in a segment called "Picturing Iraq."

The February 2010 issue of National Geographic included Sinclair's project on polygamy in America. Pictures from the series were included in The New York Times Magazine on July 27, 2008.

Her photo series, Too Young to Wed, examines "how children continue to be forced into marriage in more than 50 countries around the world." The project was the result of fifteen years of work in Afghanistan, Nepal, Ethiopia, India, Nigeria, Guatemala, and Yemen.

In 2012, Sinclair and Jessica Dimmock made a short documentary about an Ethiopian girl married at age 11.

Sinclair is the Founder and Executive Director of Too Young to Wed, a nonprofit organization whose mission is to empower girls and end child marriage globally. The organization shares a name with Sinclair's seminal body of work on child marriage, and was inspired by her years of work on the issue as a photojournalist. The organization runs on-the-ground programming through local implementing partners and awards educational scholarships to keep girls in school and out of marriage in some of the world's most vulnerable contexts. Too Young to Wed currently supports girls in Nepal, Yemen, Nigeria, and Kenya.

In 2014, a collection of Sinclair's body of work was displayed in a show at the Bronx Documentary Center, a documentary photography community center based in the South Bronx founded by photojournalist and author of Photojournalists on War: The Untold Stories from Iraq, Michael Kamber. The same year, Sinclair and Jessica Dimmock were awarded the 2014 Infinity Award: Photojournalism by the International Center for Photography.

In 2016, the BBC credited Sinclair for documenting efforts of some African leaders campaigning for the rights of girls at risk of forced or child-age marriage. Among others, she has documented the work of Thobeka Madiba Zuma (wife of Jacob Zuma), a First Lady of South Africa, and Esther Lungu, First Lady of Zambia are among those leading the effort.

In 2017, Sinclair's body of work on child marriage was displayed in the inaugural opening of the L'Arche du Photojournalisme, a premiere gallery that sits atop Paris' Grande Arche de la Defense. Organized by Visa pour l'Image Director Jean-François Leroy, the exhibition featured 175 of Sinclair's iconic images as well as six short films and educational materials on child marriage globally. 65 percent of the images featured had never been exhibited. The show honored Sinclair's documentation of child marriage in 10 countries over 15 years.

Personal life
In 2011, Sinclair's mother suffered a brain injury. Sinclair said: "When you share the experience of someone you love having a brain injury — of becoming a different person — there's an instant intimacy."

Awards

Sinclair has won multiple awards and distinctions. This includes three World Press Photo awards, the 2015 Art for Peace Award, the 2015 Lucie Humanitarian Award, the International Center of Photography 2014 Infinity Award, unprecedented three Visa D'Or Feature awards from the Visa Pour L'Image photojournalism in France, UNICEF'S Photo of the Year, the Alexia Foundation Professional Grant and the Lumix Festival for Young Photojournalism Freelens Award. She has also received the 2008 CARE International Award for Humanitarian Reportage: The Overseas Press Club's Olivier Rebbot Award (2009) for her essay, 'A Cutting Tradition: Inside An Indonesian Female Circumcision Celebration'. Sinclair has also received another World Press Photo award for her coverage of the war between Israel and Hezbollah in Lebanon in 2006, and a Pulitzer Prize for her work in documenting systemic failures in the U.S. airline industry in 2000. Sinclair is also frequently published in National Geographic and the New York Times Magazines as well as other various media outlets. In 2019 she was awarded the Dr. Erich Salomon Award.

References

External links
 
 Sinclair's profile at VII
 Sinclair's profile at National Geographic

1973 births
Living people
American human rights activists
Women human rights activists
American photojournalists
University of Florida alumni
National Geographic photographers
Women photojournalists
American women photographers